Pauldopia is a monotypic genus of flowering plants belonging to the family Bignoniaceae. It only contains one known species, Pauldopia ghonta (Buch.-Ham. ex G.Don) Steenis

Its native range is India to Indo-China. It is found in China, India, Laos, Sri Lanka, Thailand and Vietnam.

The genus name of Pauldopia is in honour of Paul Louis Amans Dop (1876–1954), a French botanist who worked extensively in Indo-china. The Latin specific epithet of ghonta is a Bengalis word which means bell, alluding to the corolla shape of the flower. See also Ghanta. Both the genus and the species were first described and published in Acta Bot. Neerl. Vol.18 on page 425-427 in 1969.

References

Bignoniaceae
Bignoniaceae genera
Plants described in 1969
Flora of India (region)
Flora of Sri Lanka
Flora of Indo-China